This list charts the most successful films at cinemas in Germany by admissions. It also lists the most popular German productions in terms of box office sales, in euros and admissions. The Jungle Book, initially released in 1968 but with subsequent reissues, is Germany's biggest film of all time since 1963 in terms of admissions with 27.3 million tickets sold, nearly 10 million more than Titanics 18.8 million tickets sold. It has grossed an estimated $108 million in Germany making it the third highest-grossing film of all time in Germany behind only Avatar (2009) ($137 million) and Titanic (1997) ($125 million). Der Schuh des Manitu (2001) is the highest-grossing German production with a gross of €63 million and a record (since 1962) 11.7 million admissions. The 1953 East German film Die Geschichte vom kleinen Muck had the most admissions for a film from East Germany with almost 13 million.

Most successful films by admissions
The table below lists the most successful films in Germany since 1963 in terms of admissions. The Jungle Book is Germany's biggest film of all time in terms of admissions with 27.3 million tickets sold, nearly 10 million more than Titanics 18.8 million tickets sold.

Highest-grossing films prior to 1963
The most successful films released prior to 1963 based on theatrical rentals in Deutschmarks to February 1984 were:

List of highest-grossing German productions

Most successful German productions by admissions
The following are the most successful German productions ranked by admissions in Germany since 1962, excluding those produced in East Germany between 1945-1990 (see separate list below).

Most successful films in East Germany based on admissions 

Below is a list of the most successful films produced in the Soviet occupation zone of Germany (1945–49) and East Germany (1949-1990). Films prior to 1949 include admissions from West Berlin and the west zones.

See also
Lists of highest-grossing films
Goldene Leinwand

Notes

References

External links
insidekino.com

German film-related lists
Germany